Josef Protschka (born 5 February 1944) is a German operatic tenor who also sang lieder and oratorio and made many recordings. A long-term member of the Cologne Opera, he appeared at international opera houses and festivals, with a focus on Mozart's roles such as Tamino. As an academic voice teacher, he was rector of the Hochschule für Musik und Tanz Köln from 2002 to 2009.

Early life and education 
Born in Prague, Protschka grew up in Düsseldorf. In 1956 at the age of 12, he performed as a soloist in Stockhausen's electronic composition Gesang der Jünglinge. A year earlier he had already sung the student in Kurt Weill's Der Jasager as part of a recording of the work for the American label MGM.

Initially he studied classical philology, philosophy, German studies and literature. He worked as a journalist and in adult education. Soon he devoted himself exclusively to his singing career, studying in Cologne with Erika Köth and Peter Witsch.

Career 
He was first engaged as a lyric tenor at the Theater Gießen, where his first role was Tamino in Mozart's Die Zauberflöte. In 1978, he moved to the Stadttheater Saarbrücken and finally in 1980 to the Cologne Opera. He appeared in the Mozart cycle staged by Jean-Pierre Ponnelle, as Tamino, as Ferrando in Così fan tutte, and in the title roles of Idomeneo and Titus. He received international recognition, appearing at the Salzburg Festival, La Scala in Milan, the Dresden Semper Opera, the Hamburg State Opera, La Monnaie in Brussels, the Royal Opera House in London and other European opera houses. At the Opernhaus Zürich, he repeated the Mozart cycle, and performed in the Monteverdi cycle staged by Ponnelle and conducted by Nikolaus Harnoncourt. He appeared at the Vienna State Opera as Eisenstein in Die Fledermaus by Johann Strauss, Hans in Smetana's Die veraufte Braut, Tamino, Florestan in Beethoven's Fidelio, and in the title role of Schubert's Fierrabras, among others. 

Over the years, Protschka made about 50 recordings as well as television and radio productions and won international prizes. A recording of Fierrabras with him in the title role was nominated for a Grammy Award as best opera recording. He retired from the stage in 2016.

At the end of the 1990s, Protschka became a university lecturer in Copenhagen and Cologne and gave master classes in several European countries. He was a professor of voice in Aachen. In 2002 he was appointed rector of the Hochschule für Musik Köln, while continuing to teach. He retired from the position in 2009.

References

External links 
 
 Official website
 Die Zeit, die ist ein kostbar Ding (interview, in German) Der Theaterverlag
 
 
 Josef Protschka (Tenor) Bach Cantatas Website

German operatic tenors
Voice teachers
Academic staff of the Hochschule für Musik und Tanz Köln
1944 births
Living people
Musicians from Prague